German submarine U-208 was a Type VIIC U-boat of the Kriegsmarine during World War II. The submarine was laid down on 5 August 1940 by the Friedrich Krupp Germaniawerft yard at Kiel as yard number 637, launched on 21 May 1941 and commissioned on 5 July under the command of Oberleutnant zur See Alfred Schlieper.

She was sunk on 7 December 1941 by ships of the British Royal Navy.

Design
German Type VIIC submarines were preceded by the shorter Type VIIB submarines. U-208 had a displacement of  when at the surface and  while submerged. She had two shafts and two  propellers.

U-208 was fitted with five  torpedo tubes (four fitted at the bow and one at the stern), fourteen torpedoes, one  SK C/35 naval gun, 220 rounds, and a  C/30 anti-aircraft gun. The boat had a complement of between forty-four and sixty.

Service history
Part of the 1st U-boat Flotilla, U-208 carried out two patrols in the North Atlantic.

First patrol
U-208s first patrol began when she left Kiel on 29 September 1941. She travelled to the Barents Sea before turning about and headed for the gap between Iceland and the Faroe Islands. She then crossed the Atlantic Ocean to Labrador and followed the coast south to Newfoundland. Turning east, she sailed for the Bay of Biscay, arriving at Brest in occupied France, on 12 November.

Second patrol and loss
The boat's second patrol took her south of Spain. Forty-five men died; there were no survivors.

Afternote
U-208 was previously thought to have been sunk by the corvette  on 11 December 1941, west of Gibraltar.

Wolfpacks
U-208 took part in one wolfpack, namely:
 Mordbrenner (16 October – 2 November 1941)

Summary of raiding history

References

Bibliography

External links

World War II submarines of Germany
German Type VIIC submarines
U-boats commissioned in 1941
U-boats sunk in 1941
U-boats sunk by depth charges
U-boats sunk by British warships
1941 ships
Ships lost with all hands
Ships built in Kiel
Maritime incidents in December 1941